Brian Lionel Impellizzeri (born 30 July 1998) is an Argentine Paralympic athlete who competes in the T37 category. He represented Argentina at the 2020 Summer Paralympics.

Career
Impellizzeri represented Argentina in the long jump T37 event at the 2020 Summer Paralympics and won a silver medal.

References 

1998 births
Living people
Sportspeople from Rosario, Santa Fe
Argentine male long jumpers
Paralympic athletes of Argentina
Athletes (track and field) at the 2020 Summer Paralympics
Medalists at the 2020 Summer Paralympics
Paralympic silver medalists for Argentina
Paralympic medalists in athletics (track and field)
21st-century Argentine people